Lindsay Davenport was the defending champion, but chose not to participate that year.

Patty Schnyder won in the final 6–3, 6–0, against Tamira Paszek.

Seeds
The top two seeds received a bye into the second round.

Draw

Finals

Top half

Bottom half

External links
 WTA tournament draws

Singles
Commonwealth Bank Tennis Classic